Scott Moore is a Canadian television executive. He is the former director of CBC Sports and head of production for Rogers Communications' Sportsnet and NHL properties. He was appointed on March 1, 2007, succeeding Nancy Lee. On November 9, 2010, Moore left CBC and on the following day he was named president of broadcasting for Rogers Media.

Moore is a graduate of Ryerson Polytechnical Institute's  Radio and Television Arts program (1984) in Toronto. He was with Rogers Sportsnet from 1997 to 2003.

Career
After graduating from Ryerson in 1984, Moore left to backpack across Europe. His resume was handed to The Sports Network (TSN) and he was granted an interview. From there, Moore worked as an assignment editor in the TSN newsroom.

During the 1988 Winter Olympics and 1988 Summer Olympics, Moore worked as a producer. He was later awarded an Emmy Award for his participation in the 1988 Olympic Games and a Gemini Award for the 1988 World Figure Skating Championship. He was subsequently hired as an executive producer for the 1992 Summer Olympics.

From there, Moore helped launch OLN and Sportsnet before moving to British Columbia. He was the co-recipient of the 2005 Jack Webster Award of Excellence in Legal Journalism for his CBC News expose "Crime on the Street" with Ian Hanomansing. Moore later came back to Toronto to run CBC Sports in 2007.

Moore returned to Sportsnet in 2010 and was eventually promoted by Rogers Media to President of Sportsnet and NHL. While working for Rogers, Moore helped broker a deal to gain control of national broadcast rights for the NHL over BCE Inc., including Hockey Night In Canada. However, ratings declined due to the lack of success for Canadian teams in the NHL and the replacement of Ron MacLean with George Stroumboulopoulos. Moore left the company in 2018.

References

Canadian television executives
Year of birth missing (living people)
Living people
Place of birth missing (living people)
Toronto Metropolitan University alumni
Canadian investigative journalists
Canadian sports journalists
Canadian Screen Award winners
Jack Webster award recipients